Vidal Bruján Esteva (born February 9, 1998) is a Dominican professional baseball second baseman and outfielder for the Tampa Bay Rays of Major League Baseball (MLB).

Career
Bruján signed with the Tampa Bay Rays as an international free agent in October 2014. He made his professional debut in 2015 with the Dominican Summer League Rays, batting .301 with two home runs, 20 RBIs, and 22 stolen bases in 60 games. He split 2016 with the Gulf Coast Rays and Hudson Valley Renegades, hitting a combined .271 with one home run and eight RBIs in 51 games, and played 2017 with Hudson Valley where he batted .285 with three home runs, 20 RBIs, and 16 stolen bases in 67 games.

Bruján played 2018 with both the Bowling Green Hot Rods (with whom he was named a Midwest League All-Star) and the Charlotte Stone Crabs where he slashed a combined .320/.403/.459 with nine home runs, 53 RBIs, and 55 stolen bases in 122 games between the two clubs. He split the 2019 season between Charlotte and the Montgomery Biscuits, hitting a combined .277/.346/.389/.735 with 4 home runs and 40 RBIs. He played for the Salt River Rafters of the Arizona Fall League following the 2019 season.

Bruján was added to the Rays 40–man roster following the 2019 season. He did not play in a game in 2020 due to the cancellation of the minor league season caused by the COVID-19 pandemic. In June 2021, Bruján was selected to play in the All-Star Futures Game.

On July 7, 2021, Bruján was promoted to the major leagues for the first time. He made his MLB debut that day as the starting second baseman in the first game of a doubleheader against the Cleveland Indians. In the game, he recorded his first career hit, an RBI single off of Indians starter J. C. Mejía.

Bruján spent most of 2022 with the Triple-A Durham Bulls, batting .292. He did, however, play in 52 games with the Rays, and also hit his first MLB home run off Devin Smeltzer on June 10th vs. the Minnesota Twins.

Personal life
Bruján's father, Vidal Sr., died from heart failure in 2018.

References

External links

1998 births
Living people
Sportspeople from San Pedro de Macorís
Dominican Republic expatriate baseball players in the United States
Major League Baseball players from the Dominican Republic
Major League Baseball infielders
Major League Baseball outfielders
Tampa Bay Rays players
Dominican Summer League Rays players
Gulf Coast Rays players
Hudson Valley Renegades players
Bowling Green Hot Rods players
Charlotte Stone Crabs players
Toros del Este players
Montgomery Biscuits players
Salt River Rafters players
Durham Bulls players